Región de Murcia International Airport (IATA: RMU, ICAO: LEMI), informally also known as Murcia-Corvera, is an international airport in southeast Spain. It opened in January 2019 and replaced Murcia–San Javier Airport. It is situated between the villages of Corvera, Los Martínez del Puerto and Valladolises within the municipality of Murcia.

Development
Tourism to the Murcia region has grown steadily for several decades, becoming popular as a less expensive alternative to established holiday areas such as the Costa del Sol. Expansion of the airport serving the area, Murcia–San Javier Airport, was becoming impractical due to its primary function as a military airfield and component of the Academia General del Aire, the officer training school of the Spanish Air Force.

In 2002 the company Aeromur (Aeropuertos de la Región de Murcia) was formed as a vehicle for investment, finance and promotion of a new regional airport. In 2006 the government put construction and operation of the airport out to tender. The Aeromur consortium, now including construction firm Sacyr, won the tender for a term of 40 years and announced it would invest 550 million Euros in the project.

Construction work began in July 2008, with the opening of the airport planned for 2010. In 2009 building stopped as Sacyr had run out of money. As banks were not willing to loan the funds to Sacyr, the regional government stepped in and guaranteed 200 million Euros of credit. The airport was completed in 2012, but did not become operational until 2019, after years of contractual wrangling between the regional government, Aeromur and Sacyr. Before opening, the concession for operating the airport was withdrawn from Aeromur and awarded to Aena.

The airport was officially opened on 15 January 2019 by the King of Spain as Aeropuerto Internacional de la Región de Murcia – Juan de la Cierva, named after the Spanish aeronautical pioneer who invented the autogyro. The first flight to arrive at the airport was Ryanair flight FR1824 from East Midlands Airport.

Facilities
The airport has a single passenger terminal of 28,500 m2 and a single runway 3,000 metres long and 45 metres wide. Its initial capacity is 3 million passengers and 23,000 movements per year, with options for subsequent increase to 5 million passengers. The terminal has 9 boarding gates, 25 check-in desks and 4 baggage reclaim belts. The runway has one rapid-exit taxiway (RET) and 4 holding bays. It is equipped with precision approach instrument ILS CAT I at threshold 23 and non-precision instrument DVOR/DME.

Airlines and destinations
The following airlines operate regular scheduled and charter flights at Región de Murcia Airport:

Statistics
The year 2020 saw a decline in passengers and operations, due to the COVID-19 pandemic and travel restrictions that were implemented globally. A total of 217,912 passengers in 2,812 operations passed through the airport, which represented a decrease of 80% and 64.7%, respectively, compared to 2019.

Access
It has direct access to the Autovía A-30 highway that runs between the two cities. There are several public bus routes connecting the airport to its surrounding areas.

In 2009, plans were revealed for the AVE high-speed rail network to serve the airport via a proposed Murcia to Cartagena line. This plan appears to have been abandoned.

References

External links

Official website

Airports in the Region of Murcia
Airports established in 2018